Yuriy Mikhailovich Chervochkin (31 December 1984 – 10 December 2007) was a Russian opposition activist. He was murdered at the age of 22. His case shook Russian opposition because he was attacked two days before Dissenters' March and some observers remained convinced that perpetrators of the crime were members of Russian Militsiya.

Oppositional activities
In 2006, Chervochkin founded a branch of the National Bolshevik Party in Serpukhov. On 2 October 2006 Chervochkin had been part of a group of 50 national-bolsheviks detained while trying to pass the State Duma in Moscow. On 11 March 2007 Chervochkin had participated in direct action in a polling station in Odintsovo to protest against election rigging. Chervochkin was arrested during the action and was placed under arrest for a month. On 11 June 2007 he was beaten by the militsiya and arrested for 5 days.
Chevochkin was repeatedly detained during the Dissenters' Marches.

Murder
22 November 2007 Chervochkin called a journalist hours before his attack and claimed he was being chased by the militsiya (UBOP), who had repeatedly detained and interrogated him earlier. According to some sources, he reported the same to his bride to be (the leader of National Bolsheviks of Tula Anna Ploskonosova), accusing an officer of militsiya, Alexey Okopny, of being behind it. In the evening he was beaten on the head with a baseball bat. Diagnosis explained an open brain injury and a fracture of the skull base. Chervochkin fell into coma. On 11 December 2007 Yuri Chervochkin died in hospital.

Investigation
The perpetrators of the crime have never been found. Two investigations, carried out by the local prosecutor's office, stalled and finally ended, due to lack of evidence.

Reactions
Garry Kasparov and Eduard Limonov participated in his funeral.

On 19 December 2007 Belarusian activists picketed the Russian Embassy in memory of Yuriy Chervochkin.  On 17 January 2008 Russian opposition groups Oborona, NBP, RNDS, AKM protested in Moscow against the murder of Yuriy Chervochkin.

Opposition and Chervochkin's family version
Chervochkin's family, friends and political comrades remained convinced that Chervochkin was the victim of Russian Militsiya. Some of observers believed that the attack may have been motivated by his political activism. Direct responsible for murder they call Department of fight against extremism of Office of fight against organized crime (UBOP) of the Moscow region and personally the chief of this department Alexey Okopny. According to them, Okopny repeatedly detained also interrogated Chervochkin; also shortly before  murder Chervochkin reported that Okopny by phone threatened to break to it the head.

On 18 October 2012 Okopny brought an action against one of party leaders «Other Russia» (the former National Bolshevik Party) Sergei Aksenov and civil activist Pavel Shechtman, demanding a denial of statements about his participation in murder. December 6, 2012 the court sentenced Aksenov and Schechtman to a fine (in 40 and 50 thousand roubles), but did not require them to publish a refutation of charges A few days later, Pavel Shechtman published the article "The Story of a Murder", in which Okopny newly is accused of involvement in the murder, based this time on the materials of the judicial process.

See also
List of unsolved murders

References

External links
Interview with Chervochkin's mother

1984 births
2007 deaths
2007 murders in Russia
Assassinated activists
Assassinated Russian politicians
Assassinations in Russia
Deaths by beating in Europe
Deaths by person in Russia
Deaths from head injury
Murdered students
National Bolshevik Party politicians
People murdered in Russia
Russian murder victims
Russian political activists
Unsolved murders in Russia